The 2022 South Alabama Jaguars baseball team represented the University of South Alabama during the 2022 NCAA Division I baseball season. The Jaguars played their home games at Eddie Stanky Field and were led by eleventh-year head coach Mark Calvi. They were members of the Sun Belt Conference.

Preseason

Sun Belt Conference Coaches Poll
The Sun Belt Conference Coaches Poll was released on February 9, 2022.  South Alabama was picked to finish first with 139 votes and 7 first place votes.

Preseason All-Sun Belt Team & Honors

Preseason Pitcher of the Year
Miles Smith (USA, Sr, Pitcher)

Preseason Team
Miles Smith (USA, Sr, Pitcher)
Hayden Arnold (LR, Sr, Pitcher)
Tyler Tuthill (APP, Jr, Pitcher)
Brandon Talley (LA, Sr, Pitcher)
Caleb Bartolero (TROY, Jr, Catcher)
Jason Swan (GASO, Sr, 1st Base)
Luke Drumheller (APP, Jr, 2nd Base)
Eric Brown (CCU, Jr, Shortstop)
Ben Klutts (ARST, Sr, 3rd Base)
Christian Avant (GASO, Sr, Outfielder)
Josh Smith (GSU, Jr, Outfielder)
Rigsby Mosley (TROY, Sr, Outfielder)
Cameron Jones (GSU, So, Utility)
Noah Ledford (GASO, Jr, Designated Hitter)

Personnel

Schedule and results

Schedule Source:
*Rankings are based on the team's current ranking in the D1Baseball poll.
|}

References

South Alabama
 South Alabama Jaguars baseball seasons
South Alabama Jaguars baseball